Anandabhairavi or Ananda Bhairavi (pronounced ānandabhairavi) is a very old melodious rāgam (musical scale) of Carnatic music (South Indian classical music). This rāgam also used in Indian traditional and regional musics. Ānandam (Sanskrit) means happiness and the rāgam brings a happy mood to the listener.

It is a janya rāgam (derived scale) of the 20th Melakarta rāgam Natabhairavi

Structure and Lakshana

Its  structure is as follows (see swaras in Carnatic music for details on the notations used):
 : 
 : 

(chathusruthi rishabham, sadharana gandharam, shuddha madhyamam, Chatusruthi dhaivatham, kaishiki nishadham)

It is a sampoorna rāgam – rāgam having all 7 swarams, but it is not a melakarta rāgam, as it has  (zig-zag notes in scale) and uses  (external note) in comparison with its parent rāgam. The anya swaram is the usage of shuddha dhaivatham (D1) in some phrases of the rāgam.
Anandabhairavi ragam is also a  rāgam, since it uses more than one anya swaram. It is also classified as a "rakti" raga(a raga of high melodic content).

Swara phrases
"G3" occurs in "ma pa ma ga ga ma", and "D1" occurs in "ga ma pa da". Subtler than the first two, "N3" occurs in "sa da ni sa."

Anandabhairavi also has unique swara patterns both in manodharma (impromptu improvisations by performer) and in its compositions. The popular patterns are  "sa ga ga ma", "sa pa", and "sa ga ma pa". The musician isn't allowed to stay long on nishadam, this characteristic distinguishes it from Reetigowla. Few allied ragas (similar) to this are Reetigowla and Huseni.

Popular compositions
Anandabhairavi is one of the favourite ragams of Syama Sastri. He is said to have made this a popular rāgam and also to have given the present form for this rāgam. More or less Anandabhairavi's synonym is "Marivere gati" by Syama Sastri. In "Mariverae" and in "O jagadhamba" Syama Sastri uses the anya swara "ga(2)".A very life changing incident is said to have happened in Thyagaraja's life. Once he is said to have attended a Kuchipudi bhagavata artists dance-drama recital,a ballad between mythological characters Radha and Krishna, and he is said to have highly praised their performance, especially a particular song Mathura Nagarilo, which was again set in Ananda Bhairavi. Thyagaraja wanting to acknowledge them offered to give them a gift, of anything that they may desire, that he could possibly give. After much thought they demanded him the Ragam Ananda Bhairavi itself as a gift ( meaning that he would accept to never sing in that ragam ever again in his life),so that when someone in the near future spoke of Thyagaraja or Ananda Bhairavi's legacy they would also remember the Kuchipudi dancers too.

Sami ni pai Adathalavarnam by Veena Kuppayyar
Yathum oore Anthem (written by Kaniyan Pungundranar) by Composer Rajan, the theme song of 10th World Tamil Conference from Sandham: Symphony Meets Classical Tamil
Paavanasuguna Aadithalavarnam by Swathi Thirunal in Sanskrit
 Padavarnam by Ponniah Pillai in Tamil
Ittii MuddulAdibAludedavade by Annamacharya in Telugu
Kamti SukravAramu by Annamacharya in Telugu
Neene Dayalu, Veera Hanuma Bahu, Hodi Nagari Mele, Summane Baruvude Mukti, Srinivasa neene, by Purandaradasa in Kannada
Laali Govinda Laali By Sripadaraja in Kannada
Palayachyutha Palayajitha, By Vadiraja Tirtha in Sanskrit
Smarasi Puraguru from the KuchelaUpakyanam by Swathi Thirunal
  Kamalasulochana,  a popular geetham
Paluke Bangaramayena by Bhadrachala Ramadasu in Telugu
Nike Teliyaka in Adi thalam by Thyagaraja in Telugu
Marivere Gati, O jagadhamba, Pahi Srigirijasuthe, Himachala Tanaya by Syama Sastri in Telugu
Maanasa guruguha, Dandayudhapanim, Kamalamba Samrakshatu, Anandeswarena and Thyagaraja yoga vaibhavam by Muthuswami Dikshitar in Sanskrit
Shringara velavan vandhan, by Papanasam Sivan in Tamil
Krishna Karuna, Pahi Tharakshupuralaya, Varija Vadana by Swathi Thirunal in Sanskrit
Bharathi pankaja by Mannargudi Sambasiva bhagavathar
Poonthen Nermozhi, Balike Moham, Maanini Vamata are three padams by Swathi Thirunal in Malayalam
Dhim dhim dhim thillana by Swathi Thirunal
Andolika Vahane (Utsavaprabandham) by Swathi Thirunal in Malayalam
Samaganapriye by Periyasaamy Thooran in Tamil
Poo Mel Valarum Annaiye by Mazhavai Chidambara Bharathi in Tamil
Raghudvaha Dâsa by Kalyani Varadarajan

Film Songs

Language:Tamil

Album

See also

List of Film Songs based on Ragas

Notes

References

Janya ragas